List of different terms by Christian denominations in Japanese presents the difference of terms between Christian denominations in Japanese. This article presents Japanese terms of Eastern Orthodoxy (Japanese Orthodox Church), Roman Catholic, Anglican Church (Anglican Church in Japan), and Protestant.

In Japan, the Roman Catholic mission began in August 1549, Protestant mission - in 1859, Eastern Orthodox mission - 1861.

Each different mission founded their churches, determined terms in Japanese, and translated the Bible and other religious books, whose activities are almost separately by denominations.

Their terms have concepts found by each theology or history, etc. They are suitable for using in own denomination. Thus Japanese Christians use many different terms in each denomination.

Liturgy

Clergy 
As Protestantism does not have a hierarchy, its frames are omitted here.

In some of Protestants, bishop is "監督", pastor is "牧師" and deacon is "執事".

Saints

References 

 東方正教会＆ローマ・カトリック　聖職者対照表 - Different terms of clergy between Eastern Orthodoxy and Roman Catholic in Japanese, including English
 『大研究』主要索引＆英和対照表　増補版 - Study of English - Japanese translations in terms of Christianity 
 教派いろいろ対照表 - Comparing Christian denominations 

List of different terms by Christian denominations in Japanese
Japanese terms